Agelena nigra is a species of spider in the family Agelenidae, which contains at least 1,350 species of funnel-web spiders . It was first described by  Caporiacco, in 1940. It is primarily found in Ethiopia.

References

Endemic fauna of Ethiopia
nigra
Arthropods of Ethiopia
Spiders of Africa
Spiders described in 1940